Edwin Forrest Bligh (June 30, 1864 – April 18, 1892) was an American catcher in Major League Baseball player from Brooklyn, New York, who played for four teams during his four-season career. He didn't collect his first base hit until his third season, and fourteenth at bat, when he was purchased by the Columbus Solons from the Cincinnati Red Stockings for $1500 on December 14, 1888. He played in a total of 66 games, collecting 34 hits in 209 at bats for a .163 career batting average.

Ned died of typhoid fever at the age of 27 in his hometown of Brooklyn, and is interred at Holy Cross Cemetery.

References

External links

1864 births
1892 deaths
19th-century baseball players
Major League Baseball catchers
Baltimore Orioles (AA) players
Cincinnati Red Stockings (AA) players
Columbus Solons players
Louisville Colonels players
Sportspeople from Brooklyn
Baseball players from New York City
Lawrence (minor league baseball) players
New Orleans Pelicans (baseball) players
Troy Trojans (minor league) players
Deaths from typhoid fever
Burials at Holy Cross Cemetery, Brooklyn